Trixagus dermestoides  is a species of false metallic wood-boring beetles native to Europe.

References

Beetles described in 1767
Beetles of Europe
Taxa named by Carl Linnaeus